The 2022–23 Elite One Championship will be the 88th season of France's domestic rugby league competition and the 22nd season known as the Elite One championship. The competition will expand back to ten teams following the promotion of Baroudeurs de Pia XIII (also known as the Pia Donkeys) from Elite 2 after winning the title in 2021-22. 

Each team will play 18 matches in the regular season. The top six teams will progress to a three-week final series played throughout April-May 2023.

Teams

Regular season 
The regular season started on 2 October 2022 and will end on 14 April 2023. Each team was scheduled with every other team twice, once at home and the other away making 18 games for each team and a total of 90 games.

Ladder 

 3 points for a victory
 1 point bonus for the losing team if the margin is less than 12
 If two teams have equal points then the separation factor is the point difference. If a team has a greater point difference they rank higher on the table. If still tied then head-to-head matches will be the tie-breaker.

Results 
Source:

Matches

References 

Rugby league competitions in France
2022 in French rugby league
2023 in French rugby league
Current rugby league seasons